Vijan is a surname. Notable people with the surname include:

Dinesh Vijan, Indian film producer and director
Rakhi Vijan, Indian actress